Adeline Blancquaert (born 24 May 1996) is a Belgian-Flemish politician for Vlaams Belang who has been a member of the Flemish Parliament since 2019.

Blancquaert studied languages as the University of Ghent became involved Vlaams Belang Jongeren as a student. In the Belgian elections of 26 May 2019, she was elected to the Flemish Parliament for Vlaams Belang representing the East Flanders electoral district. She was also delegated by her party to the Senate as state senator.

References 

1996 births
Living people
Vlaams Belang politicians
Members of the Flemish Parliament
21st-century Belgian politicians
Members of the Senate (Belgium)